Harry A. Monk, Sr. (c. 1902 – November 23, 1979) was a Canadian curler. He was a member of 1947 Brier Champion team (skipped by Jimmy Welsh), playing as lead, representing Manitoba. A member of the Deer Lodge Curling Club in Winnipeg, he was also a three-time provincial champion.

References

1900s births
1979 deaths
Brier champions
Canadian male curlers
Scottish emigrants to Canada
Curlers from Winnipeg